ADP-ribosylation factor-like protein 13B (ARL13B), also known as ADP-ribosylation factor-like protein 2-like 1, is a protein that in humans is encoded by the ARL13B  gene.

Function 

This gene encodes a member of the ADP-ribosylation factor-like family. The encoded protein is a small GTPase that contains both N-terminal and C-terminal guanine nucleotide-binding motifs. This protein is localized in the cilia and plays a role in cilia formation and in maintenance of cilia.

Clinical significance 

Mutations in the ARL13B gene are associated with the Joubert syndrome.

References

External links

Further reading